Mingo Creek is a stream in Stoddard and Wayne counties in the U.S. state of Missouri. It is a tributary of St. Francis River.

The stream headwaters are within the Mingo Swamp in Wayne County (at ).

Mingo Creek took its name from Mingo Swamp.

See also
List of rivers of Missouri

References

Rivers of Stoddard County, Missouri
Rivers of Wayne County, Missouri
Rivers of Missouri